Rowett is a surname. Notable people with the surname include:

People
Catherine Rowett (born 1956), British Member of the European Parliament for the Green Party
Gary Rowett (born 1974), English footballer and manager
Henry Rowett, English cricketer in the 1760s
John Quiller Rowett (1874–1924), British businessman in the spirits industry
Richard Rowett (1830–1887), leading figure of nineteenth-century Illinois and American history
Tim Rowett (born 1942), British video presenter about toys
Rowett Junior Kawondera (2003-present), footballer

Other
Rowett Island (South Shetland Islands)
Rowett Research Institute, Aberdeen, Scotland, researches nutrition

See also
Shackleton-Rowett Expedition (1921–22), Antarctica
Rowetta, English singer